Bee is an unincorporated community in Hart County, Kentucky, United States.

A post office called Bee was established in 1906, and remained in operation until 1958. The community may have the name of Barnard Elliott Bee Jr.

References

Unincorporated communities in Hart County, Kentucky
Unincorporated communities in Kentucky